The New Peoples' Society (Pinyin: Xīnmín huì) was established on 11 January 1920. It was the first organization for political movement, created by Taiwanese students in Japan during the Japanese rule of Taiwan.

References

Taiwan under Japanese rule
1920 establishments in Taiwan